The Red Dragon is a 1946 mystery film starring Sidney Toler as Charlie Chan, who has to sift through a host of suspects for three murders.

The film marks the first appearance of Willie Best as Chattanooga Brown, Birmingham Brown's cousin.  Compared with Mantan Moreland's appearances as Birmingham Brown, Best's portrayal of Chattanooga was broader and played more upon racial stereotypes.  The character was dropped after two appearances.

Cast
 Sidney Toler as Charlie Chan
 Fortunio Bonanova as Insp. Luis Carvero
 Benson Fong as Tommy Chan
 Willie Best as Chattanooga Brown
 Carol Hughes as Marguerite Fontain
 Barton Yarborough as Joseph Brandish
 Don Costello as Charles Masack
 George Meeker as Edmond Slade
 Marjorie Hoshelle as Countess Irena Masak
 Mildred Boyd as Josephine
 Barbara Jean Wong as Iris Ling (as Jean Wong)

DVD release
The Red Dragon has been released on DVD.

References

External links
 
 
 

 

1946 films
1946 crime films
American black-and-white films
Charlie Chan films
Monogram Pictures films
1946 mystery films
American crime films
American mystery films
Films directed by Phil Rosen
1940s American films